Feuergriffel is a literary prize awarded in Baden-Württemberg, Germany. It is a Stadtschreiber Scholarship for Children's and Youth Literature presented by the City Library Mannheim.

Winners 
 2007: Tamara Bach 
 2009: Antje Wagner 
 2011: Rike Reiniger
 2013: Saša Stanišić
 2015: Tobias Steinfeld
 2017: Florian Wacker
 2019: Tania Witte
 2021: Julia Willmann

External links
 

Literary awards of Baden-Württemberg